The Arcade is a historic two-story building in Cookeville, Tennessee. It was built in 1913 on land that belonged to Gillian Maxwell and Robert Farley, the co-founders of Dixie College, later known as Tennessee Technological University. The building was designed by Maxwell, and built by Joe Scott and Bill Smoot. It was later acquired by Charlie Gibson, who sold it to Robert Lee Maddux in 1927. It has been listed on the National Register of Historic Places since April 17, 1979.

References

National Register of Historic Places in Putnam County, Tennessee
Commercial buildings completed in 1913
1913 establishments in Tennessee